An inmate telephone system, also known as an Inmate Calling Service (ICS) or Inmate telephone service, is telephone service intended for use by inmates in correctional facilities in the United States. Telephone service for inmates allows for their rehabilitation by allowing consistent communication with their family and legal counsel while incarcerated.

In the United States, prison telecom is a $1.2 billion industry, mostly controlled by two private equity-backed companies—Global Tel Link (GTL) with a 50% market share as of 2015. and Securus Technologies, with 20%. The prison telecom industry has come under scrutiny due to the nature of their business model, as high commissions paid by providers as part of exclusive contracts with individual facilities are passed down to consumers through service rates significantly higher than standard phone service. While there have been attempts by the United States' telecom regulator, the FCC, to regulate the costs of inmate telephone services, the Court of Appeals for the D.C. Circuit ruled that its policy violated the Telecommunications Act, which forbids the FCC from regulating intrastate communications.

Operation
In order to use an inmate telephone service, inmates must register and provide a list of names and numbers for the people they intend to communicate with. Call limitations vary depending on the prison's house rule, but calls are typically limited to 15 minutes each, and inmates must wait thirty minutes before being allowed to make another call. Calls are recorded and monitored by the prison's staff.  Phone credits are typically accessed via an inmate account card. Since 2001, the Federal Bureau of Prisons has required that use be limited to 300 minutes per-month.

Providers 
In the United States, the inmate telephone market is dominated by two providers, Global Tel Link (GTL) and Securus Technologies, with Global Tel-Link controlling approximately 50% of the market and Securus with 20%. The New York-based private equity firm, Veritas Capital, with assets of over five billion, acquired GTL under the tenure of Veritas' founder and CEO Robert B. McKeon. Mobile, Alabama-based GTL was a subsidiary of GTEL Holdings in 2009 and offered "inmate communications, investigative, facility management, visitation, payment and deposit, and content solutions".

New York-based American Securities purchased GTL for $1 billion in 2011, and Boston-based ABRY Partners purchased Securus in 2013 for $640 million. > When the global private-equity company Castle Harlan purchased Securus Technologies from Miami-based private equity company, H.I.G. Capital in 2011, they claimed that Securus was "the leading provider" of "inmate telecommunications for the corrections industry".

Service rates
Before the 1990s, in the United States, service rates for phone calls within jails were similar to those available to the general public through commercial providers. Since then jail phone service providers began to charge higher rates for the phone services than traditional home phone service.
Illinois congressman Bobby L. Rush introduced "The Family Telephone Connection Protection Act of 2007" that began the discussion of rate regulation for inmate telephone calls. This Bill brought about the defining of the actual costs of telephone services from jails and it was hoped would result in a standardization of rates among inmate telephone providers in 2009 or 2010.

One of the reasons for the significantly higher telephone rates stems from that facilities enter into exclusive concession contracts with a specific company to provide inmate calling services for all their inmates, typically favoring the provider that can provide larger commissions to the facility via their service fees. A Congressional Research Service 2010 report cited concerns expressed by Citizens United for the Rehabilitation of Errants (CURE), that "telephone providers often pay prison operators a high percentage of the fees they collect for prisoners’ collect calls, and then charge inmates well-above general market rates for service...with commissions on telephone service... as high as 45- 65% of gross revenues generated by the service." Federal officials and States had become "dependent on a small group of companies" and the rise of a "prison-industrial complex" is "dependent on government funds" and has a "vested interest in the continuation or expansion of the prison system." The National Sheriffs Association claim that the contractual arrangements with service providers "ensure security and allow them to monitor inmate phone calls" and that "changing the rules could endanger public safety". Bloomberg Businessweek reported in 2014, that exorbitant rates are typically meant to compensate for the high commissions paid to the facilities the provider serves. These practices have been frequently criticized by the families of inmates, who feel that these providers had exploited their personal situations in order to turn a profit. Corrections facilities and law enforcement agencies typically resisted attempts to lower these fees, arguing that they provide additional funding to support a facility's operations, such as security.

On August 9, 2013, the Federal Communications Commission adopted a report on the high cost of inmate calling services, with proposed reforms. A 2013 FCC analysis, described how, in some cases, long-distance calls are charged six times the rate on the outside, or in other instances, a fifteen-minute call could cost upwards of $15. It also reported that phone rates had "caused inmates and their friends and families to subsidize everything from inmate welfare to salaries and benefits, states’ general revenue funds and personnel training". At that time the FCC proposed capping the charge for interstate inmate phone calls at $3.75 for 15 minutes. The proposal was approved in 2014; a cap was also implemented to reduce the high long-distance charges that inmates incurred to eleven cents per minute, so that a fifteen-minute call should not cost more than $4. According to the FCC, Global Tel-Link had been charging as much as $17.30 for such calls under contracts with facilities in Arkansas, Georgia and Minnesota, which resulted in "unreasonably high" phone bills for inmates' families.  In retaliation for the change, service providers raised the rates on local calls.

In 2015, the FCC imposed new caps of 11¢ to 22¢ on all inmate calls. The decision was criticized by the industry, who felt that the capped prices would be insufficient to cover the commissions they must pay. By March, the new caps had been stayed pending the result of a lawsuit against the FCC filed by providers, but the FCC stated that it would enforce the existing caps on intrastate calls as well.  In September 2015, Human Rights Watch requested that Michael Fisch, CEO of American Securities, the private equity group that owned GTL, step down from their board of directors as "GTL's exploitation of the ability of prisoners to communicate with their families and children is the antithesis of upholding human dignity and advancing human rights, and is in direct conflict with Human Rights Watch’s mission."

In November 2016, the Court of Appeals for the District of Columbia Circuit granted a stay, requested by Securus, to block a proposed compromise by the FCC to set the rate cap to 13¢ to 31¢ per-minute on inter and intrastate calls. In the wake of the stay, Ajit Pai criticized Democrats for appealing and the courts for intervening on ICS rate regulations. The two ICS providers, GTL and CenturyLink, asked for a delay in another FCC hearing in Washington, that was set for February 6, 2017. By January 19, 2017, the D.C. Circuit still refused to pause the FCC challenge to reform inmate calling rates. Commissioners Ajit Pai, Mignon Clyburn, and Jessica Rosenworcel, who were on the August 2013 Commission when the reform report was adopted, had dissented in 2013, and were likely to find for GTL and CenturyLink.

Upon the start of the Trump administration, both Rosenworcel and Pai were nominated to the FCC. In his first week as chairman, Pai began to roll back, or declare his intent to roll back, a number of pro-consumer policies implemented by the FCC during the Obama administration (such as Net neutrality). As a result, Pai instructed the FCC's lawyers to cease defending the commission's actions in court. On June 13, 2017, the Appeals Court ruled in favor of Global Tel Link, arguing that the FCC's attempt to regulate the pricing of intrastate prison calls exceeded its authority under the Telecommunications Act of 1996, which forbids the FCC from regulating intrastate communications.

In June 2019, Sen. Tammy Duckworth introduced the Martha Wright-Reed Just and Reasonable Communications Act, which would once again authorize the FCC to regulate prison phones and cap the rate of calls made from state and local prisons. It was passed by Congress and signed by President Joe Biden in January, 2023.

References

External links
Federal Communications Commission
Free Inmate lookup

Telephone services
Prison-related organizations